Shirley C. Raines is an American public speaker, author and leadership consultant who retired from academia after serving as president of the University of Memphis from 2001 to 2013. Before entering administration she was a professor of education, specializing in early childhood.

Early life
Raines was born April 15, 1945 in Jackson, Tennessee, and grew up on a cotton farm near Bells. She completed her undergraduate education at UT Martin, studying child development, and then worked as a kindergarten teacher for several years. She later undertook further studies at UT Knoxville, graduating with an M.Sc. in child development and later a D.Ed. in elementary and early education.

Academia
Before entering administration, Raines taught for periods at the University of Alabama; North Carolina Wesleyan College; Northeastern State University, Oklahoma; George Mason University, Virginia; and the University of South Florida. In 1995, she was appointed dean of education at the University of Kentucky; she was additionally made vice-president for academic affairs three years later. She served as president of the Association for Childhood Education International from 1999 to 2001. In January 2001, the board of regents of the University of Memphis elected Raines as the successor to President V. Lane Rawlins – the first woman to hold the position. Her term began on July 1, 2001, and continued until her retirement on June 30, 2013. As president, Raines oversaw the acquisition of Lambuth University, the establishment of the University of Memphis Research Foundation and the Memphis Research Consortium, and the construction of a number of new buildings. She was inducted into the Tennessee Women's Hall of Fame in 2013, and retired to Oak Ridge, Tennessee, where she works as a motivational speaker and leadership consultant.

See also
 List of women presidents or chancellors of co-ed colleges and universities

References

1945 births
People from Crockett County, Tennessee
University of Tennessee alumni
University of Tennessee at Martin alumni
University of Alabama faculty
North Carolina Wesleyan College
Northeastern State University faculty
George Mason University faculty
University of South Florida faculty
University of Kentucky faculty
Heads of universities and colleges in the United States
Women heads of universities and colleges
Living people
People from Jackson, Tennessee